Wild Swans is a 1991 autobiographical novel by Jung Chang.

Wild Swan or Wild Swans may also refer to:

 Swan, a bird
 "The Wild Swans", a 1838 fairy tale by Hans Christian Andersen
 The Wild Swans (1962 film), a Soviet animated film
 The Wild Swans (1977 film), a Japanese anime fantasy film
 The Wild Swans (novel), a 1999 novel by Peg Kerr
 Wild Swans (ballet), a 2003 ballet composed by Elena Kats-Chernin
 The Wild Swans at Coole, a poetry collection by W. B. Yeats
 "The Wild Swans at Coole" (poem), a poem in the above collection
 The Wild Swans (band), a band from Liverpool, England
 The Wild Swan (album), a 2016 album by Foy Vance
 "Wild Swan" (song), a 1988 song by Magnum off the album Wings of Heaven
HMS Wild Swan, two ships of the Royal Navy

See also

 Swan (disambiguation)